Karaś  is a lake in the Masurian Lake District of north-eastern Poland,  from the town of Iława in Warmian-Masurian Voivodeship.

Since 1984 it has been protected under the Ramsar convention as an important breeding ground for water birds. It is currently one of 13 such sites in Poland.

References

Lakes of Poland
Ramsar sites in Poland
Lakes of Warmian-Masurian Voivodeship